"Wasted Years" is a 1960 gospel song by Wally Fowler. Although taking credit for the song, the song was not actually written by Fowler, but by Albert Williams, Fowler's pianist with the John Daniel Quartet.

Recordings
Wally Fowler and the Oak Ridge Quartet
Sons of Song
 The Sensational Nightingales
 Jimmy Swaggart
 The Statesmen Quartet

References

1960 songs
Gospel songs